Balázs Babella (born 21 June 1978 in Vác ) is a Hungarian flatwater canoer and former world champion in the four-man kayak K-4 200 m, winning golds in 2005 and 2007.

Babella is a member of the Pécs Canoe Club.

Babella has since retired from international competition and is currently in Singapore coaching its Kayak and Canoe National Team.

References

1981 births
Hungarian male canoeists
Living people
ICF Canoe Sprint World Championships medalists in kayak
People from Vác
Sportspeople from Pest County
21st-century Hungarian people